Cheers to the Best Memories is a collaboration album by Canadian duo Dvsn and American singer Ty Dolla Sign. It was released on August 20, 2021, by OVO Sound and Warner. The album includes guest appearances from Mac Miller, YG and Rauw Alejandro.

Singles and promotion
On June 30, 2021, Dvsn and Ty Dolla Sign announced the collaboration album releasing the first single "I Believed It" featuring Mac Miller. On August 18, 2021, they announced the release date and title of the album while releasing the second single "Memories".

Track listing

Note
  indicates a co-producer

Personnel
Musicians

 Daniel Daley – lead vocals (1–7, 9–12)
 Ty Dolla Sign – lead vocals (1–8, 10–12), keyboards, programming (7, 11)
 Noah "40" Shebib – keyboards, programming (1, 2)
 Nineteen85 – keyboards, programming (1–3, 5, 6, 9, 11)
 Mike Moore – piano, talk box (1); keyboards, programming (10)
 Johan Lenox – string arrangement (1, 11)
 Yasmeen Al-Mazeedi – violin (1, 10-11)
 Eric Kim – violin (1, 11)
 Joe Reeves – keyboards (3, 4), programming (3)
 G Ry – programming (4)
 Murda Beatz – keyboards, programming (6)
 Damn James! – keyboards, programming (7)
 Mike Woods – keyboards, programming (8)
 Nascent – keyboards, programming (8)
 Frank Dukes – keyboards, programming (9)
 Mac Miller – vocals (11)

Technical

 Chris Athens – mastering engineer
 Manny Marroquin – mixer (1–5, 7–11)
 Jaycen Joshua – mixer (6)
 Ty Dolla Sign – recording engineer (1, 3, 5–7, 10)
 James Royo – recording engineer (1, 3, 5–8, 10)
 Rafael "Fai" Bautista – recording engineer (2, 4–10)
 Patrik Plummer – recording engineer (5)
 Dave Huffman – assistant mastering engineer
 Harrison Holmes – assistant mastering engineer
 Anthony Vilchis – assistant mixer (1–5, 7–11)
 Trey Station – assistant mixer (1–5, 7–11)
 Zach Pereyra – assistant mixer (1–5, 7–11)
 Gabe Shaddow – assistant recording engineer (2, 4)
 Nate Graves – assistant recording engineer (2, 4)
 Piéce Eatah – assistant recording engineer (8)
 Jeff Crake – assistant engineer (3, 5–7, 10, 11)

Charts

References

2021 albums
Dvsn albums
Ty Dolla Sign albums
OVO Sound albums
Albums produced by Nineteen85
Albums produced by Noah "40" Shebib
Albums produced by Murda Beatz
Albums produced by Jermaine Dupri
Albums produced by Frank Dukes